Béatrice Uria Monzon (born 28 December 1963 in Agen (Lot-et-Garonne)) is a French mezzo-soprano.

Biography 
Daughter of the Spanish painter Antonio Uria-Monzon, Béatrice Uria Monzon studied at the secondary school Joseph Chaumié, at the Bernard Palissy d'Agen High School and at the Catholic High School St Jean de Lectoure (Gers) where she was introduced to singing in the choir of the high school led by Roland Fornerod. She then went to the University of Bordeaux.

She began her career as a lyric singer in 1987, as a mezzo-soprano. In 1989, she was Chérubin in Mozart's The Marriage of Figaro at the Opéra national de Lorraine.

She is known for her numerous performances of the title role of Bizet's Carmen which she interpreted at the Opéra Bastille in 1993 and 1994, then again in 1997, 1998, 1999, and on the most important stages of the world during the same period (1994: Grand Théâtre de Bordeaux and the Teatro Colón in Buenos Aires; 1995: Opéra Royal de Wallonie; 1996: Teatro Massimo in Palerme, Teatro Regio; 1997: Théâtre du Capitole in Toulouse; 1998: Chorégies d'Orange, Vienna State Opera, Metropolitan Opera of New York).

She has also performed the French and Italian repertoires: Massenet: Charlotte in Werther, Hérodiade (title role), Dulcinée in Don Quichotte, Chimène in Le Cid (alongside Roberto Alagna), Anita in La Navarraise; Berlioz: Cassandre and Didon in Les Troyens, Béatrice in Béatrice et Bénédict, Marguerite in la Damnation de Faust; Ambroise Thomas: Gertrude in Hamlet, Mignon (title role); Poulenc: Mère Marie in Dialogues of the Carmelites; Saint-Saëns: Dalila in Samson and Delilah, Offenbach: Giulietta in The Tales of Hoffmann;
Italian repertoire: Bellini: Adalgisa in Norma, Donizetti: Sarah in Roberto Devereux, Eleonore in La Favorite (French and Italian versions); Verdi: Fenena in Nabucco, Amnéris in Aida, Eboli in Don Carlos (French and Italian versions); Mascagni: Santuzza in Cavalleria rusticana and also Wagner as Vénus in Tannhauser as well as Judith in Bartók's Bluebeard's Castle, in the Hungarian language.

In 2012, she performed in Puccini's Tosca.

Discography 
Opera integrals
 Georges Bizet, Carmen (Carmen), Orchestre national Bordeaux-Aquitaine, dir. Alain Lombard, Naïve
 Jules Massenet, Werther (Charlotte), Orchestre national de Lille, dir. Jean-Claude Casadesus, Naxos Records
 Serge Prokofiev, The Love for Three Oranges (Sméraldine), Opéra de Lyon orchestra, dir. Kent Nagano, Virgin classics

Other vocal works
 Hector Berlioz, Cantates, La Mort de Cléopâtre, Orchestre national de Lille, dir. Jean-Claude Casadesus, Naxos
 Maurice Ravel, Cantates pour le prix de Rome, Alcyone, orchestre du Capitole de Toulouse, dir. Michel Plasson, EMI

Videography 
 Jacques Offenbach, The Tales of Hoffmann (Giulietta), Orchestre de l'Opéra national de Paris, dir. Jesus Lopez-Cobos, TDK
 Serge Prokofiev, The Love for Three Oranges (Fata Morgana), Orchestre de l'Opéra national de Paris, dir. Sylvain Cambreling, TDK
 Ambroise Thomas, Hamlet (Gertrude), orchestre du Gran Teatre del Liceu, dir. Bertrand de Billy, EMI
 Georges Bizet, Carmen (Carmen), symphonic orchestra of the Gran Teatre del Liceu, dir. Marc Piollet, C Major
 Richard Wagner, Tannhäuser (Vénus), with Peter Seiffert (Tannhäuser) and Petra-Maria Schnitzer (Elizabeth), orchestra of the Gran Teatre del Liceu, dir. Sebastian Weigle, C Major (DVD and Blu-ray).

References

External links 
 Béatrice Uria Monzon's personal website
 Notice in Who's Who in France
 Béatrice Uria Monzon on France Musique
 Béatrice Uria Monzon on Opera Online
 Interview with Béatrice Uria Monzon on Forum Opera
 Biographie
 Carmen Liceu, Barcelone 2011 on YouTube

French operatic mezzo-sopranos
1963 births
People from Agen
Chevaliers of the Légion d'honneur
Chevaliers of the Ordre des Arts et des Lettres
Officers of the Ordre national du Mérite
Living people
20th-century French women opera singers
21st-century French women opera singers